Berliner Straße or Berliner Strasse is the name of streets:

Berlin
 Berliner Straße (Berlin-Blankenfelde)
 Berliner Straße (Berlin-Französisch Buchholz)
 Berliner Straße (Berlin-Heinersdorf)
 Berliner Straße (Berlin-Hellersdorf)
 Berliner Straße (Berlin-Hermsdorf)
 Berliner Straße (Berlin-Pankow)
 Berliner Straße (Berlin-Spandau)
 Berliner Straße (Berlin-Tegel)
 Berliner Straße (Berlin-Wilmersdorf) with the underground station Berliner Straße
 Berliner Straße in Berlin-Zehlendorf, part of Berlin-Potsdamer Chaussee

Former name
 Adlergestell in Schmöckwitz/Grünau
 Wernsdorfer Straße in Schmöckwitz/Grünau
 Alt-Friedrichsfelde (Straße) in Friedrichsfelde/Lichtenberg
 Brunsbütteler Damm in Staaken
 Fürstenwalder Damm in Friedrichshagen
 Hauptstraße (Berlin-Lichtenberg) in Lichtenberg
 Karl-Marx-Straße (Berlin) in Neukölln
 Richardstraße (Berlin) in Neukölln
 Konrad-Wolf-Straße in Alt-Hohenschönhausen
 Lehderstraße in Weißensee
 Marienfelder Allee in Marienfelde
 Ostpreußendamm in Lankwitz/Lichterfelde/Steglitz
 Schnellerstraße in Niederschöneweide/Adlershof/Köpenick
 Oberspreestraße in Niederschöneweide/Adlershof/Köpenick
 Straße des 17. Juni in Charlottenburg
 Otto-Suhr-Allee in Charlottenburg

Other cities
 Berliner Straße (Bad Freienwalde)
 Berliner Straße (Cottbus)
 Berliner Straße (Frankfurt am Main)
 Berliner Straße (Offenbach am Main)
 Berliner Straße (Wuppertal)
 historical name of Świętej Trójcy street and Grunwaldzka street in Bromberg (now Bydgoszcz, Poland)

Other uses
 Urbana Gerila, a former Yugoslav punk rock and new wave band from Belgrade
 Berliner Straße (film set), a film set in the Babelsberg Film Studios